HCT Co., Ltd. is a South Korean compliance testing and equipment calibration company that also develops particle counters and antennas. Founded in 2000 as Hyundai Calibration & Certification Technologies Co., the company is a spin-off from Hyundai Electronics, the world's second-largest memory chipmaker. HCT has testing and calibration sites in Korea, the United States, and China.

History 

 2000 Hyundai Calibration & Certification Technology Co., Ltd founded as a spin-off from Hyundai Electronics
 2000 Accredited as a Certified Calibration Laboratory by the Korean Agency for Technology and Standards KOLAS (ISO/IEC 17025)
 2002 Accredited as a Certified Testing Laboratory by the Korean Agency for Technology and Standards KOLAS (ISO/IEC 17025)
 2006 Established HCT's China branch (Wuxi)
 2006 Developed their first Scanning Nano Particle Counter (SNPC).
 2007 Officially renamed HCT Co., Ltd. from Hyundai Calibration & Certification Technologies
 2010 Established a branch in Dallas, Texas for field testing
 2011 Relocated to the new HCT head office building in Icheon, South Korea
 2012 Established HCT America (San Jose, CA)
 2013 HCT America LLC TCB Accreditation
 2015 Telepermit (New Zealand) Accreditation
 2016 CRA (Iran) Accreditatio
 2016 A2LA (United States) Accreditation
 2016 Listed on the Stock Exchange (KOSDAQ)
 2017 HCT America LLC A2LA Accreditation (ISO/IEC 17025) )
 2017 Hyundai-Kia Motors EMC Testing Lab Accred

Products and Services

Compliance Testing 

 EMC Testing
 RF Testing
 Safety and Reliability Testing
 Battery Testing
 SAR and OTA
 Wired Telephony Testing
 Wireless Telecommunications Testing

Equipment Calibration 
 Particle Counters
 Aircraft Approach & Landing Systems Equipment
 Calibration Software for AT4 signal generator

Research and development 
 Particle Counters
 Wide Range Aerosol Particle Spectrometer (WAPS)-developed with Samsung Electronics
 Impactors for Clean Room Environments
 Inhalation Toxicity Systems

Antennas 
 Low Frequency Card Antennas
 Mobile Phone Antennas (Internal)
 Mobile Phone Antennas (FPCB Type)
 Automobile Multi Band Antennas
 Metal Case Dual SIM Phone Antennas

References

External links 
 HCT Co., Ltd. - Official Website

Electronics companies of South Korea
Companies established in 2000
South Korean brands